Erola is a Finnish surname. Notable people with the surname include:

 Jan Erola (born 1969), Finnish journalist, communications consultant, and publisher
 Judy Erola (born 1943), Canadian politician

Surnames of Finnish origin
Finnish-language surnames